

250001–250100 

|-bgcolor=#f2f2f2
| colspan=4 align=center | 
|}

250101–250200 

|-id=164
| 250164 Hannsruder ||  ||  (1939–2015), a German professor of astrophysics at the University of Tübingen || 
|}

250201–250300 

|-bgcolor=#f2f2f2
| colspan=4 align=center | 
|}

250301–250400 

|-id=354
| 250354 Lewicdeparis ||  || The WIC de Paris (Women International Club), welcomes women of all nationalities living in and around Paris and provides them a friendly environment for sharing cultures. || 
|-id=370
| 250370 Obertocitterio ||  || Oberto Citterio (born 1933) is an astronomer at the Italian National Institute for Astrophysics. He has made important contributions in the field of astronomical optics and instrumentation from infrared to γ-rays, with particular reference to the X-ray optics technology used for many space projects. || 
|-id=374
| 250374 Jírovec ||  || Vojtěch Matyáš Jírovec (1763–1850), also known as Adalbert Gyrowetz, was a Bohemian composer born in České Budějovice. || 
|}

250401–250500 

|-bgcolor=#f2f2f2
| colspan=4 align=center | 
|}

250501–250600 

|-id=526
| 250526 Steinerzsuzsanna ||  || Zsuzsanna Steiner (1927–2012), a Hungarian physics and mathematics teacher || 
|}

250601–250700 

|-id=606
| 250606 Bichat ||  || Xavier Bichat (1771–1802), a anatomist and pathologist || 
|}

250701–250800 

|-id=719
| 250719 Jurajbardy ||  ||  (1919–2011) was a Slovak amateur astronomer and secondary school teacher who taught at the Gymnasium in Považská Bystrica. As an enthusiastic popularizer of astronomy, he contributed to its development in the region. He was the designer of the Považská Bystrica sundial. || 
|-id=774
| 250774 Syosset ||  || Syosset is a hamlet on Long Island, New York. Originally colonized by Dutch settlers in the 1600s, it became a well populated, suburban town after World War II. The discoverer was born in Syosset. || 
|}

250801–250900 

|-id=840
| 250840 Motörhead ||  || Motörhead, a British heavy metal group established in 1975 || 
|}

250901–251000 

|-bgcolor=#f2f2f2
| colspan=4 align=center | 
|}

References 

250001-251000